

References

Devon
King G
King G
Lists of buildings and structures in Devon